.ci is the Internet country code top-level domain (ccTLD) for Côte d'Ivoire.

Domain names

In most situations, specific registrations are done using a second level domain name. Côte d'Ivoire also makes use of a special convention with an introductory name such as chu- instead of the second level domain name.

 Embassies: amb-name.ci
 Hospitals: chu-name.ci
 Tourism Offices: ot-name.ci
 Universities: univ-name.ci
 Companies House: cci-name.ci
 City Halls: mairie-name.ci

Secondary level domains

The following are the existing second level names. The registration services offer to add more if necessary.

 .org.ci, or.ci – International Organization
 .com.ci, co.ci – Commercial Organization, Business
 .edu.ci, ed.ci, ac.ci – Education, schools, universities, academies
 .net.ci – Network related businesses
 .go.ci – Governmental organizations

References

External links
.ci domain registration website

Country code top-level domains
Communications in Ivory Coast
Computer-related introductions in 1995

sv:Toppdomän#C